Sebastia (also Sebastea, Sebasteia; Greek Σεβαστεία) may refer to:

 Sebastia, Nablus, a Palestinian village in the West Bank
 Sivas, an Ancient Roman Armenian city, now Sivas in Turkey
 Sebasteia (theme), a Byzantine province named after the city
 Malatia-Sebastia District, in Yerevan, Armenia
 Sebastia (moth), a moth genus

See also
 Sant Sebastià
 Sebastian (disambiguation)